Hazina is an administrative ward in the Dodoma Urban district of the Dodoma Region of Tanzania.

In 2016 reports there were 7,205 people in the ward, from 9,540 in 2012, and 11,717 in 2002. The ward has .

References

Wards of Dodoma Region